Wang Shuxin (born September 1966) is a Chinese scientist who is a professor at Tianjin University, a former vice president of Tianjin University, and currently president of Chongqing University.

Biography
Wang was born in Xuanhua County (now Xuanhua District), Hebei, in September 1966. He holds a Bachelor of Engineering degree from Hebei University of Technology, and Master of Engineering and Doctor of Engineering degrees from the Tianjin University, all in mechanical manufacturing and automation.

Starting in February 1990, Wang successively served as assistant (February 1990), lecturer (August 1992), associate professor (November 1994), full professor (November 1998), and doctoral supervisor (June 1999) of Tianjin University. He moved up the ranks to become dean of Graduate School in May 2017 and vice president in September 2018. He was a visiting scholar at the Robot Laboratory in Paris (2001), King's College London (2008), and the University of Michigan (2010).

In June 2022, he was appointed president of Chongqing University, a position at vice-ministerial level.

Honours and awards
 2013 State Science and Technology Progress Award (Second Class)
 2016 State Technological Invention Award (Second Class)
 2020 State Technological Invention Award (Second Class)
 2021 Member of the Chinese Academy of Engineering (CAE)

References

1966 births
Living people
People from Zhangjiakou
Scientists from Hebei
Hebei University of Technology alumni
Tianjin University alumni
Members of the Chinese Academy of Engineering